The Zipping Classic, is a Melbourne Racing Club Group 2 Thoroughbred horse race held under weight for age conditions over a distance of 2400 metres run at Sandown Racecourse, Melbourne, Australia in mid November. Prize money is A$750,000.

History
The event was initially held by the Williamstown Racing Club at the Williamstown Racecourse. After the racecourse grandstand burned to the ground in 1947 the racing club amalgamated with the privately owned Victorian Trotting and Racing Association to become the Melbourne Racing Club and moved the event to Sandown Racecourse. In 1963 the racing club merged with the Victoria Amateur Turf Club and the club changed the name of the event.

Prior to 1999 the conditions of the race were an open handicap. Since 2011, the name of the race has been changed to honour Zipping, after he won the race for a fourth consecutive time in 2010. In 2013, the race was transferred to Caulfield due to renovations occurring at Sandown.

Meanwhile, in 2010 the Melbourne Racing Club introduced a new Sandown Cup into the program. This event became a Listed race in 2012 and is held over 3,200 metres.

Since 2021, the race is run at Caulfield Racecourse and occurs two weeks later than its usual date after the Flemington carnival.

Name
1888–1962 - Williamstown Cup (except in 1945 it was called the Victory Cup for the end of World War II)
 1963–1998 - Sandown Cup
 1999–2010 - Sandown Classic
 2011 onwards - Zipping Classic

Grade
1888–1978 - Principal race
1979 onwards  - Group 2

Distance
 1888–1919 - 1 miles (~2200 metres)
 1920–1942 and 1951–1971 - 1 miles (~2400 metres)
 1943–1950 - 1 miles (~2600 metres)
 1972 onwards - 2400 metres

Winners since 1999

Earlier winners 

 1998 - Cheviot
 1997 - Star Binder
 1996 - Royal Snack
 1995 - Count Chivas
 1994 - Our Pompeii
 1993 - Tawlord
 1992 - Silk Ali
 1991 - Stylish Century
 1990 - Pressman's Choice
 1989 - Sydeston
 1988 - Conbituate Lady
 1987 - Colour Page
 1986 - Pharostan
 1985 - Puckle Harbour
 1984 - Rich Brother
 1983 - Al Dwain
 1982 - Bianco Lady
 1981 - Allez Bijou
 1980 - Arwon
 1979 - Hauberk
 1978 - Salamander
 1977 - Tom's Mate
 1976 - Kiwi Can
 1975 - Captain Peri 
 1974 - Pyramul
 1973 - Baghdad Note
 1972 - Stormy Seas
 1971 - Gunsynd
 1970 - What's Brewing
 1969 - General Command
 1968 - Better Talk
 1967 - Future
 1966 - Light Fingers
 1965 - Red William
 1964 - Sir Wynyard
 1963 - Conference
 1962 - New Statesman
 1961 - Twilight Glow
 1960 - Ilumquh
 1959 - Royal Jester
 1958 - Droll Prince
 1957 - Sailor's Guide
 1956 - Fighting Force
 1955 - Ray Ribbon
 1954 - Prince Cortauld
 1953 - Royal Radiant
 1952 - Morse Code
 1951 - Shoreham
 1950 - Morse Code
 1949 - Saxony
 1948 - Gayness
 1947 - Columnist
 1946 - Royal Scot
 1945 - Counsel
 1944 - Peter
 1943 - Claudette
 1942 - Phocion
 1941 - Throttle
 1940 - Remarc
 1939 - Maikai
 1938 - Manolive
 1937 - John Wilkes
 1936 - Amalia
 1935 - Garrio
 1934 - Gothic Gem
 1933 - Shadow King
 1932 - Yarramba
 1931 - Second Wind
 1930 - Second Wind
 1929 - Cimbrian
 1928 - Amounis
 1927 - Star D'Or
 1926 - Bard Of Avon
 1925 - The Tyrant
 1924 - San Antonio
 1923 - Wynette
 1922 - King Ingoda
 1921 - Tangalooma
 1920 - Millieme
 1919 - Richmond Main
 1918 - Sea Bound
 1917 - Prince Bardolph
 1916 - Wishing Cap
 1915 - Carlita
 1914 - Aleconner
 1913 - Sea Prince
 1912 - Almissa
 1911 - Duke Foote
 1910 - Aborigine
 1909 - Kerlie
 1908 - Iolaire
 1907 - Thackeray
 1906 - Ellis
 1905 - Demas
 1904 - St. Ambrose
 1903 - Billali
 1902 - Eleanor
 1901 - Flagship
 1900 - Paul Pry
 1899 - Delusive
 1898 - Auriferous
 1897 - Battalion
 1896 - Merman
 1895 - Music
 1894 - Taranaki
 1893 - Jeweller
 1892 - E.K.
 1891 - Propounder
 1890 - Don Giovan
 1889 - Tarcoola
 1888 - Mara

Charts results (1983– )

See also
 List of Australian Group races
 Group races

References

Horse races in Australia
Open middle distance horse races